Bournemouth War Memorial is a First World War memorial built in 1921, located in the central gardens in Bournemouth, United Kingdom. The memorial is guarded by two stone lions made by WA Hoare. It was designed by Bournemouth's deputy architect Albert Edward Shervey, who copied the two lions (one sleeping, the other awake and roaring) from Antonio Canova's lions which guarded the tomb of Pope Clement XIII. 

The war memorial stands near Bournemouth Town Hall and St. Andrew's Church, Richmond Hill.

Gallery

See also
Grade II* listed buildings in Bournemouth
Grade II* listed war memorials in England

References

World War I memorials in England
World War II memorials in England
Bournemouth
Grade II* listed buildings in Dorset
Buildings and structures completed in 1921
Military history of Bournemouth